Wilhelm Jakob Rink von Baldenstein (1624–1705) was the Prince-Bishop of Basel from 1693 to 1705.

Biography

Wilhelm Jakob Rink von Baldenstein was born in Birseck Castle on 10 January 1624.

On 3 August 1688 the cathedral chapter of Basel Münster elected him to be coadjutor bishop of Basel.  On 27 September 1690 Pope Alexander VIII confirmed this appointment and also named Baldenstein titular bishop of Curium at the same time.  He was consecrated as a bishop by Franz Christoph Rinck von Balderstein, auxiliary bishop of Eichstätt, on 26 August 1691.  He succeeded as Prince-Bishop of Basel upon the death of Bishop Johann Konrad von Roggenbach on 13 July 1693.

He died on 4 June 1705.

References

1624 births
1705 deaths
Prince-Bishops of Basel